The Minim Martap mine is a bauxite mine in the Adamawa Region in northern Cameroon. As of 2020, it has estimated reserves of 832 million tonnes. It takes its name from the nearby village of Minim.

See also 

 List of mines in Cameroon

References 

Mines in Cameroon
Adamawa Region